Humeral circumflex artery can refer to:
 Posterior humeral circumflex artery
 Anterior humeral circumflex artery

See also
Circumflex branch of left coronary artery